This is a list of Swedish Army brigades. Brigades were introduced to the Swedish Army in 1948. The last brigades were phased out in 2000.

Infantry brigades

Norrland brigades
Norrland Brigades were infantry brigades specialised in sub-arctic warfare.

Armoured brigades

Mechanized brigades

2000–present

See also 
 Military district (Sweden)
 List of Swedish defence districts
 List of Swedish regiments

External links 
 Swedish infantry brigades (Swedish)

 
Army